Abkhazian Regional Academy of Sciences (ARAS), independent scientific and educational organization, was founded in 1995, in Tbilisi (Republic of Georgia), by a group of famous scientists – refugees from Abkhazia. Academicians and Corresponding Members of ARAS are leading scientists of Georgia (Guranda Gvaladze, Zaal Lomtatidze, Zurab Papaskiri, Otar Zhordania, Jemal Gamakharia, etc.), representatives of social and humanitarian sciences, natural and life sciences, technical sciences and modern technologies. The Academy is registered by the Ministry of Justice of Georgia and recognized by the Georgian National Academy of Sciences (GNAS). The Presidium of the Academy is based in Tbilisi. In 2000–2009 President of the Academy was Professor, Dr.Med. Shota Gogokhia. Since 2009 President of ARAS is Professor, Doctor of Biological Sciences Zaal (Zurab) Lomtatidze.

National academies of sciences
National academies of arts and humanities
Education in Georgia (country)
1995 establishments in Georgia (country)
Scientific organizations established in 1995